Peter Llewellyn Williams (born 21 March 1964) is a British stage and television actor. He is best known for his part as Much the Miller's Son in the 1980s cult TV series Robin of Sherwood.

Williams was born in Paddington.  In addition to his television appearances, he is a stage actor, whose appearances include Good Lads at Heart; Henry V; Richard III; Rosencrantz and Guildenstern Are Dead; No Good Sitting on the Old School Fence; The Hired Man; Richard II; Dick Whittington.

References

External links 
 

British male television actors
British male stage actors
1964 births
Living people
People from Paddington